Iverson Louis Harris (1805 – 1876) was a justice of the Supreme Court of Georgia from 1866 to 1868.

He was born in Watkinsville, Georgia. He lived in Milledgeville, Georgia. He succeeded Judge Charles J. Jenkins as the latter became governor.

He had a namesake son who was a professor at the Theosophical Society Lomaland .

References

External links
 

1805 births
1876 deaths
People from Watkinsville, Georgia
Justices of the Supreme Court of Georgia (U.S. state)
19th-century American judges